Bedi is a census town and port in Jamnagar Taluka of Jamnagar district, Gujarat, India.

History
It was a major port of Nawanagar State during the British period.

Geography
It has an average elevation of 7 metres (22 feet).

Demographics
 India census, Bedi had a population of 18,771. Males constitute 51% of the population and females 49%. Bedi has an average literacy rate of 33%, lower than the national average of 59.5%; with 73% of the males and 27% of females literate. 18% of the population is under 6 years of age.

References

Cities and towns in Jamnagar district
Ports and harbours of Gujarat